Upenough is a historic home and national historic district located at Cazenovia in Madison County, New York. The district contains four contributing buildings. The main house was built about 1910 and is a two-story, wood-frame dwelling in the Dutch Colonial Revival  style. It features a widely flaring gambrel roof intersected by dormers on the front and rear.  Also on the property is a guest cottage, tool shed, and garage.

It was added to the National Register of Historic Places in 1991.

References

Houses on the National Register of Historic Places in New York (state)
Historic districts on the National Register of Historic Places in New York (state)
Colonial Revival architecture in New York (state)
Houses completed in 1910
Houses in Madison County, New York
Dutch Colonial Revival architecture in the United States
National Register of Historic Places in Cazenovia, New York